The 1992 Barcelona Dragons season was the second season for the franchise in the World League of American Football (WLAF). The team was led by head coach Jack Bicknell in his second year, and played its home games at Estadi Olímpic de Montjuïc in Barcelona, Spain. They finished the regular season in first place of the European Division with a record of five wins and five losses. In the WLAF semifinals, the Dragons lost to the Sacramento Surge 17–15.

Personnel

Staff

Roster

Schedule

Standings

Game summaries

Week 1: vs Frankfurt Galaxy

Week 2: vs New York/New Jersey Knights

Week 3: vs London Monarchs

Week 4: at Frankfurt Galaxy

Week 5: at London Monarchs

References

Barcelona Dragons seasons